Guido de Lavezaris (c. 1512 – d. 1581) was the second Spanish Governor General of the Philippines. He succeeded Miguel López de Legazpi in 1572 as governor, and was succeeded by Francisco de Sande on August 25, 1575.

Early life
Little was known of Governor-General Lavezares. In 1543, he became a member of the Villalobos Expedition that traveled to the Philippines. He became the royal treasurer of the expedition during the navigation. Later on, he was one of several prisoners who escaped from a prison in Ambon Island when Villalobos' crew and ships were captured by the patrolling Portuguese.

Governorship
During his governorship, he directed Legazpi's grandson Juan de Salcedo to go to the northern portion of Luzon together with some 100 Spanish soldiers and conquer the present-day Ilocos and establish Villa Fernandina. Lavezaris also conquered the peninsula of Camarines and granted vast encomiendas to his loyal generals.

In 1574, he defeated the notorious Chinese pirate Limahong when the latter attempted to colonize the Philippines. In 1575, Spanish friar Martín de Rada filed a complaint to King Philip II of Spain against Lavezaris, which led to his removal from office. He was reported for abusing power and imposing higher tributes to the natives.

Post-governorship
He never returned to Spain but retired as a wealthy encomendero. His successor Francisco de Sande issued a decree in 1576 stating the division of his encomienda into smaller lands which were to be distributed to the natives. Sande also filed legal cases like usurpation to him, but this was later absolved by Philip II.
The municipality of Lavezares, Northern Samar was named after him.

Bibliography

Maura, Juan Francisco. La Relación del suceso de la venida del tirano chino del gobernador Guido de Lavezares (1575): Épica española en Asia en el siglo XVI. Edición, transcripción y notas (incluye facsimil del manuscrito original), Juan Francisco Maura. Lemir (Departamento de Filología Hispánica de la Universidad de Valencia) 2004.

References

Captains General of the Philippines
Encomenderos
16th-century Spanish people
Authors of Spanish ethnographic accounts of the Philippines in the 16th century
Year of death unknown
Year of birth unknown
Year of birth uncertain
Burials at San Agustin Church (Manila)